Front Porch is the sixth studio album by American singer-songwriter Joy Williams. It was released on May 3, 2019 by Sensibility Recordings. It was nominated for Best Folk Album at the 62nd Grammy Awards.

Critical reception
On AllMusic, Stephen Thomas Erlewine said, "Working with producer Kenneth Pattengale, who is best known as part of the Milk Carton Kids, Williams strips away any contemporary affectations, keeping the focus directly on the songs and her plaintive, powerful voice."

On PopMatters, Chris Conaton wrote, "And it's hard to deny that Front Porch is Williams at her best. It took some time for her to come to terms with it, but this is an album that embraces Williams' legacy from the Civil Wars and incorporates it into her own musical personality."

On NPR, Jewly Hight said, "She's framed Front Porch as her return home – to a stripped-down, acoustic palette... to Nashville, the Southern, music-making city where she's spent most of her professional life following a coastal California youth... For Williams, there's a balance to be struck between theatrical and intimate expression, and embracing warmth and simplicity as an approach... doesn't require abandoning poise and polish."

Track listing

Personnel
Credits adapted from AllMusic

Emily Algar – A&R
Andy Barron – photography
Richie Biggs – mixing
Caitlin Canty – backing vocals
Anthony da Costa – guitar, backing vocals
Brett Davis – studio assistant
Richard Dodd – mastering
Michelle Freetly – studio assistant
John Mailander – mandolin, violin
Scott Mulvahill – bass
Russ Pahl – pedal steel guitar
Kenneth Pattengale – dobro, guitar, mandolin, backing vocals, producer
Dustin Richardson – assistant engineer
Matt Ross–Sprang – engineer
Joy Williams – lead vocals, backing vocals
Nate Yetton – A&R, executive producer

Charts

References

External links

2019 albums
Joy Williams (singer) albums
Columbia Records albums
Albums produced by Charlie Peacock